Singles are individual trading or game cards sold by hobby stores, online stores, or by individual collectors. These individual cards are usually of higher value than contemporary cards which are often sold as "bulk" or as a personal collection. Ordinary collectible cards serve little function beyond memorabilia, but CCGs are also used in game tournaments. Generally, collectible card games (CCG) fetch initial higher prices than trading cards because of the dual nature of being both a game and a collectible. Prices will fluctuate for CCGs as cards become legal or illegal to play in certain game formats.

Value
A single card's value is determined by its scarcity. However, coupled with artificial scarcity and the function of a card in CCGs, prices for a single card can increase. Powerful cards can mean the difference between winning or losing in a tournament. This can also be called the "playability" of a card.

Grading

Cards are graded according to their physical condition and categories may vary depending on the source. The better the grade, the higher the price of the card.

Mint - A card with no flaws - straight out of a booster pack and into a card sleeve or other protective case.
Near Mint - A card with almost no visible wear or sign of being played.
Excellent/Fine/Slightly Played - A card that has been used but with minimal wear.
Very Good/Good - A card that has been used but may have more wear than a card in Excellent condition. May have slightly bent corners or wear on many of the edges or faces of the card.
Fair/Moderately Played - Many visible signs of wear or discoloration. Bent corners, creases, scuffing or other imperfections. May be banned from tournament play.
Poor/Heavily Played - Heavily abused card with significant wear or damage. Most likely not playable in tournaments.

Collecting
It is often said that when playing a CCG, the best way to obtain the cards you desire is not via booster packs, but by buying the individual singles you need for your deck. Purchasing booster packs is often seen as a form of gambling, since you don't know what you'll get until after you've paid. Even though the price for an individual card may be more than the price of booster pack, you will likely save money in the long run, as opposed to randomly getting one from a booster pack.

Autographs
Some singles have been autographed by someone related to the card. The person who autographed the card may be depicted, or their artwork is visible on the card. Cards may also be autographed by the card designer or by a person famous for using that card. The value of an autographed card has been debated, often depending on who has autographed it or the scarcity of the autograph. In some cases, an autograph can be seen as damage to the card, or graffiti.

Counterfeits
Fake cards are made to imitate real cards and often sold into the card market. In November 1995, Canadian police were notified of counterfeiters in the Windsor, Ontario area. The police seized 40,000 fake Magic: the Gathering cards, including film plates.

See also
Card sleeve
Card binder

References

Card game terminology
Collectible card games
Trading cards